William Coverdale (c. 1801 – 28 September 1865) was an English-born builder and architect in Canada West.

Personal life 
The son of Christopher Coverdale, the family is thought to have arrived in Lower Canada around 1810 before coming to Kingston, Upper Canada around 1833. Coverdale married Catherine Delmage and had five children. Unlike his many Anglican contemporaries, Coverdale was a practicing member of the Wesleyan Methodist Church.

Career 
Coverdale worked as master builder on the construction of Kingston Penitentiary from 1836–1840, and was involved in the later additions of the dining hall, perimeter walls, and towers in the mid-1840s. When Kingston city architect George Browne was discharged on 20 May 1855, Coverdale was hired to replace him.

He oversaw the construction of Kingston City Hall from 1844 and prepared plans for the rebuilding of the rear wing after it burned down in 1865; the rebuilding was completed by his son William Miles Coverdale.

In 1859, Coverdale was hired as architect for the Government of Canada's Criminal Lunatic Asylum.

He designed plans for several large residences and a number of churches in Kingston, many of which are still in use today.

Death 
Coverdale died in Kingston in 1865 at the age of 64, with his most reputable building, Rockwood Asylum, only partially complete.

Designated Heritage Buildings

References

External links 
 

1801 births
1865 deaths
19th-century Canadian architects